Gervase Wheeler (1815–1889) was a British architect, writer, and illustrator who designed homes in the United States.

Wheeler is best known for publishing influential architectural pattern books Rural Homes (1851) and Homes for the People in Suburb and Country (1855). These books include house plans as illustrations, while the prose focuses on architectural best practices and Wheeler's personal opinions about American culture and aesthetics. He promoted Italianate style as well as Carpenter Gothic.

Wheeler moved to the U.S. in 1846 or 1847 and stayed until the 1860s, after which he returned to London.

Personal life 
Wheeler's father, who was also named Gervase, worked as a manufacturer of gold, silver and gilded jewelry from 1832 to 1844. London directories indicate he worked at 28 Bartlett's Buildings in Holborn, then just outside London.

In 1855, he stated that "the desire to build, to have a home of one's own is implanted in the breast of every American, and I fancy statistics would show that the number of those who own homesteads in this country far exceeds England."

Buildings designed
Henry Boody House, Brunswick, Maine
 Rockwood Hall, Mount Pleasant, New York
 Patrick Barry House, Rochester, New York
 Olmstead House, East Hartford, Connecticut (the design of which inspired The Willows, Morristown, New Jersey)
 Chapel at Bowdoin College, Brunswick, Maine
 Chapel at Williams College, Williamstown, Massachusetts

References

Bibliography
  Home for the people, in suburb and country 1855
  The choice of a dwelling 1871
Renée Tribert and James F. O’Gorman, Gervase Wheeler: A British Architect in America, 1847–1860 (Middletown, CT: Wesleyan University Press, 2012).

1815 births
1889 deaths
Artists from London
English expatriates in the United States
19th-century British architects